The France's 1979–1980 nuclear test series was a group of 22 nuclear tests conducted in 1979–1980. These tests followed the 1975–1978 French nuclear tests series and preceded the 1981–1982 French nuclear tests series.

References

French nuclear weapons testing
1979 in French Polynesia
1980 in France
1979 in France
1980 in French Polynesia